The following is a partial list of prominent city squares:

Africa

Egypt
Tahrir Square – Cairoin M

Ethiopia
Meskel Square – Addis Ababa
Mexico Square – Addis Ababa

Morocco
Djemaa el Fna – Marrakech

South Africa
Grand Parade – Cape Town
Greenmarket Square – Cape Town
Church Square – Pretoria
Hoffman Square - Bloemfontein

Ghana
Independence Square – Accra

Zimbabwe
Ascot Piazza – Bulawayo
Mzilikazi Square – Bulawayo
Africa Unity Square – Harare

Asia

Hong Kong
 Civic Square – Admiralty
 Connaught Place – Central
 Edinburgh Place – Central
 Jockey Club Town Square – Yuen Long
 Statue Square – Central
 Yue Man Square – Kwun Tong
 Sheung Wan Fong – Sheung Wan
 Golden Bauhinia Square – Wan Chai
 Tuen Mun Cultural Square – Tuen Mun

India
 Dalhousie Square – Kolkata
 India Gate Complex, New Delhi
 Connaught Place, New Delhi
 New Market, Kolkata
 Badi chowk, Jaipur
 Manek chowk, Ahmedabad
 Maharaj Bada, Gwalior
 Rajwada, indore 
 Ghantaghar, kanpur 
 Auroville
 Central Square, Chennai
 Anna Sathukkam, Chennai
 Meenakshi Square, Madurai
 Aranganathar Square, Trichy
 Tholkappiyar Sathukkam, Tanjore
 Periyar Square, Erode
 John stone Sathukkam (Kamarajar Sathukkam), Kotagiri
 Kanyakumari Square, Kanyakumari
Bistupur Public Square, Jamshedpur

Indonesia
 Medan Merdeka (Merdeka Square) – Jakarta
 Lapangan Banteng (Banteng Square) – Jakarta
 Lapangan Merdeka (Merdeka Square) – Medan
 Alun-Alun Bandung (Bandung City Square) – Bandung
 Simpang Lima Square – Semarang
 Alun-Alun Utara dan Selatan (North and South Palace Squares) – Surakarta and Yogyakarta
 Lapangan Puputan Badung (Puputan Badung Square) – Denpasar

Iran
 Naghsh-e Jahan Square – Isfahan
 Haram-i Motahhar – Mashhad
 Namazi Square – Shiraz
 Azadi Square – Tehran

Israel
In Jerusalem:
Allenby Square
Davidka Square
Safra Square
Western Wall Plaza
Zion Square
In Tel Aviv:
Atarim Square
Dizengoff Square
Kikar hamedina
Magen David Square
Rabin Square

Japan
 Imperial Palace Square – Tokyo

Kazakhstan
Independence Square, Nur-Sultan
In Almaty:
Astana Square
Republic Square
The Golden Square
Abay Square

Mainland China
 Tiananmen Square – Beijing
 Xinghai Square – Dalian
 Union Square – Hotan
 People's Square – Shanghai

North Korea
 Kim Il Sung Square – Pyongyang

South Korea
 Gwanghwamun Plaza – Seoul
 Seoul Plaza – Seoul

Lebanon
Martyrs' Square – Beirut
Nejme Square – Beirut

Malaysia
Dataran Bandaraya Johor Bahru – Johor
 Dataran Merdeka (Merdeka Square) – Kuala Lumpur
 Esplanade – George Town, Penang
National Heroes Square – Putrajaya
 Putrajaya Independence Square – Putrajaya
 Sibu Town Square – Sibu, Sarawak

Mongolia
Sükhbaatar Square – Ulaanbaatar
Tsedenbal Square – Ulaanbaatar
Zhukov Square – Ulaanbaatar
Independence Square – Choibalsan

Nepal
Asan – Kathmandu
Maru – Kathmandu
Indra Chok – Kathmandu

Philippines
Bacolod Public Plaza, Fountain of Justice – Bacolod
Plaza Independencia – Cebu City
In Manila:
Liwasang Bonifacio
Plaza de Armas
Plaza Dilao
Plaza Lacson
Plaza Mexico
Plaza Miranda
Plaza Moraga
Plaza Moriones (Intramuros)
Plaza Moriones (Tondo)
Plaza Rajah Sulayman
Plaza de Roma
Plaza San Lorenzo Ruiz

Taiwan
 City Hall Square – Taipei
 Liberty Square – Taipei
 Nishi Honganji Square – Taipei

Tajikistan
 Dousti Square – Dushanbe

Turkmenistan 
 Garaşsyzlyk Square – Ashgabat

Thailand
 Royal Plaza – Bangkok
 Sanam Luang – Bangkok
 Tha Phae Gate square – Chiangmai
 Suranaree Square – Nakhon Ratchasima

Vietnam
 Ba Dinh Square – Hanoi
 August Revolution Square – Hanoi
 Labour Square – Hanoi
 Tonkin Free School Square – Hanoi
 Nguyen Hue Square – Ho Chi Minh City

Australia and Oceania

Australia
In Adelaide:
Hindmarsh Square
Hurtle Square
Light Square
Victoria Square
Wellington Square
Whitmore Square
Anzac Square, Brisbane
King George Square, Brisbane
Kings Square, Fremantle
Moseley Square, Glenelg
City Square, Melbourne
Federation Square, Melbourne
Russell Square, Perth
Victoria Square, Perth
Wellington Square, Perth
Taylor Square, Sydney
Queen's Square – Sydney

Fiji
City Square – Suva

French Polynesia
To'ata Square (Place To'ata) – Papeete, Tahiti
Vai'ete Square (Place Vai'ete) – Papeete, Tahiti

New Zealand
Aotea Square – Auckland
Khartoum Place – Auckland
St Patrick's Square – Auckland
Cathedral Square – Christchurch
Victoria Square – Christchurch
Anzac Square – Dunedin
The Octagon – Dunedin 
The Square – Palmerston North
Civic Square – Wellington

Europe

Albania
Skanderbeg Square – Tirana

Armenia
Republic Square – Yerevan
Charles Aznavour Square – Yerevan
 Freedom Square – Yerevan
 Garegin Nzhdeh Square – Yerevan
 Square of Russia – Yerevan
Grigor Tatevatsi Square – Goris

Azerbaijan
Freedom Square – Baku
Azneft Square – Baku

Austria
Heldenplatz – Vienna
Mexikoplatz – Vienna
Naschmarkt – Vienna
Rathausplatz – Vienna
Stephansplatz – Vienna

Belgium
 Handschoenmarkt – Antwerp
 Grote Markt – Antwerp
 St. Jans Vliet – Antwerp
 Grand-Place – Brussels
 Luxembourg Square – Brussels
 Grote markt Sint-Niklaas – Sint-Niklaas

Bulgaria

Stochna Gara Square – Plovdiv
In Sofia:
Prince Alexander of Battenberg Square
St. Alexander Nevski Square (the area around the Alexander Nevsky Cathedral)
Atanas Burov Square (the square in front of the Presidency)
Baba Nedelya Square
Bulgaria Square (the square in front of the National Palace of Culture)
Macedonia Square
Stochna Gara Square
Nezavisimost Square (The Largo)
Predgarov Square (in front of the Central railway station)
Giuseppe Garibaldi Square
Pencho Slaveykov Square (sometimes called only Slaveykov)
Pametnika Levski Square (the area around the Vassil Levski monument)
Orlov Most Square
Lavov Most Square
Narodno Sabranie Square (National Assembly)

Croatia
 In Zagreb:
 Ban Jelačić Square
 Eugen Kvaternik Square
 Žrtava Fašizma Square
 Franjo Tuđman Square
 Zrinjski Square
 King Tomislav Square
 King Petar Krešimir IV Square
 King Petar Svačić Square
 Juraj Strossmayer Square
 Ante Starčević Square
 Marko Marulić Square
 Mažuranić Square
 Republic of Croatia Square
 Roosevelt Square
 Trešnjevački Square
 Francuske Republike Square

Cyprus
For a full list of main squares in Cyprus see Plateia.
 Eleftheria square (πλατεία Ελευθερίας) – Nicosia

Czech Republic
Old Town Square (Staroměstské náměstí) – Prague
Wenceslas Square (Václavské náměstí) – Prague
Jan Palach Square (Náměstí Jana Palacha) – Prague

Denmark
In Copenhagen:
The City Hall Square
Gammeltorv
Nytorv
Axeltorv
Amagertorv
Kongens Nytorv

Estonia

Central Square (Keskväljak) – Kärdla
Leiger's Square (Leigri väljak) – Kärdla
Virula Square (Virula väljak) – Kohtla-Järve
Peter's Square (Peetri plats) – Narva
Town Hall Square (Raekoja plats) – Narva
Central Square (Keskväljak) – Paide
Central Square (Keskväljak) – Pärnu
Youth Square (Noorte väljak) – Pärnu
In Tallinn:
Iceland's Square (Islandi väljak)
Town Hall Square (Raekoja plats)
Theatre's Square (Teatri väljak)
Towers' Square (Tornide väljak)
Freedom Square (Vabaduse väljak)
Viru Square (Viru väljak)
Town Hall Square (Raekoja plats) – Tartu

Finland
In Helsinki:
Market Square, Helsinki (Kauppatori, Salutorget)
Rautatientori/Järnvägstorget (Railway Square in English)
Helsinki Senate Square (Senaatintori, Senatstorget)
Töölö Square (Töölöntori, Tölö torg)
Hakaniemi Square (Hakaniemen tori, Hagnäs torg)
Hietalahti Square (Hietalahden tori, Sandvikens torg)
Fredrik's Square (Fredrikintori, Fredrikstorget)
Vaasa Square (Vaasanpuistikko, Vasaskvären)
In Tampere:
Tampere Central Square (Keskustori) 
Tammela Square (Tammelantori)
Laukko Square (Laukontori)
Sori Square (Sorin aukio)
Market Square – Turku
Market Square – Oulu
Market Square – Kuopio
In Vaasa:
Market Square, Vaasa (Kauppatori, Salutorget)
Palosaari Square (Palosaaren tori, Brändö torg)
Barracks Square (Kasarmintori, Kaserntorget)

France
Place des Quinconces – Bordeaux
Grand'Place – Lille
Place Bellecour – Lyon
Place de la Comédie – Montpellier
Place Stanislas – Nancy
Place Masséna – Nice
In Paris:
Place de la Bastille
Place de la Concorde
Place de la République
Place Vendôme
Place de l'Étoile
Place des Vosges
Place du Tertre
Place Dauphine
Place de l'Opéra
Place de l'Hôtel de Ville
Place du Palais-Royal
Place des Victoires
Place de Furstenberg
Place Kléber – Strasbourg
Place du Capitole – Toulouse

Georgia
Freedom Square – Batumi
Freedom Square – Tbilisi

Germany
 In Berlin:
 Alexanderplatz
 Breitscheidplatz
 Gendarmenmarkt
 John-F.-Kennedy-Platz
 Platz der Republik
 Potsdamer Platz
 Schlossplatz
 Domshof – Bremen
 Marktplatz – Bremen
 In Cologne:
 Alter Markt
 Fischmarkt
 Heumarkt
 Neumarkt
 Rathausplatz (Cologne)
 Rudolfplatz
 In Dortmund:
 Borsigplatz
 Friedensplatz
 Hansaplatz
 Nordmarkt
 Alter Markt
 Altmarkt – Dresden
 Neumarkt – Dresden
 Schlossplatz – Dresden
 Konstablerwache – Frankfurt
 Opernplatz – Frankfurt
 Römerberg (Frankfurt) – Frankfurt
 Spielbudenplatz – Hamburg
 Marktplatz – Hildesheim
 Augustusplatz – Leipzig
 In Munich:
 Alter St.-Georgs-Platz
 Anhalter Platz
 Bernd-Eichinger-Platz
 Karlsplatz (Stachus)
 Königsplatz
 Marienplatz
 Max-Joseph-Platz
 Münchner Freiheit
 Odeonsplatz
 St.-Anna-Platz
 Viktualienmarkt
 Wittelsbacher Platz

Gibraltar
Cathedral Square
Grand Casemates Square
John Mackintosh Square

Greece
For a full list of main squares in Greece see Plateia
Syntagma Square – Athens
Omonoia Square – Athens
Kolonaki Square – Athens
Kotzia Square – Athens
Kypselis Square – Athens
Central Market Square ("Agora") – Chania
Constitution Square – Nafplion
Georgiou I Square – Patras
Ippokratous Square – Rhodes
Aristotelous Square – Thessaloniki
Spianada Square – Corfu (city)

Hungary
In Budapest:
John Paul II Square (57,600 m2)
Elisabeth Square (43,200 m2)
Square of the '56-ers (36,500 m2)
Heroes' Square
Kossuth Lajos Square
Széll Kálmán Square
Móricz Zsigmond Circus
Kosztolányi Dezső Square
Flórián Square
Batthyány Square
Szent Gellért Square
Astoria
Blaha Lujza Square
Kálvin Square
Oktogon
Baross Square
Nyugati Square
Lehel Square
Liberty Square
Örs vezér Square

Ireland
In Dublin:
Merrion Square
Parnell Square
Mountjoy Square
Fitzwilliam Square
St Stephen's Green
Eyre Square – Galway

Italy
Piazza Émile Chanoux – Aosta
Piazza del Popolo – Ascoli Piceno
Piazza Risorgimento – Benevento
Piazza Santa Sofia – Benevento
Piazza Vecchia – Bergamo
Piazza Maggiore – Bologna
Piazza della Loggia – Brescia
Piazza Carlo III – Caserta
Piazza del Duomo – Catania
In Florence:
Piazza della Signoria
Piazza del Duomo
Piazza Santa Croce
Piazza della Repubblica
Piazza Santa Trinita
Piazza della Libertà
Piazzale Michelangelo
Piazza Saffi – Forlì
Piazza De Ferrari – Genoa
Piazza della Vittoria – Gorizia
Piazza della Transalpina – Gorizia
Piazza Dante – Grosseto
Piazza del Duomo – L'Aquila
Piazza del Duomo – Lecce
Piazza della Vittoria – Lodi, Lombardy
Piazza dell'Anfiteatro – Lucca
Piazza Sordello – Mantua
Piazza delle Erbe – Mantua
In Milan:
Piazza del Duomo
Piazza Cordusio
Piazza della Scala
Piazza Duca d'Aosta
Piazza Duomo – Messina
Piazza Grande – Modena
In Naples:
Piazza del Plebiscito
Piazza Borsa
Piazza Dante
Piazza Garibaldi
Piazza dei Martiri
Piazza Cavalli – Piacenza
Piazza dei Miracoli – Pisa
Piazza delle Gondole – Pisa
Knights' Square (Pisa) – Pisa
Prato della Valle – Padua
Quattro Canti – Palermo
Piazza Marina – Palermo
Piazza Pretoria – Palermo
Piazza del Duomo – Parma
Piazza del Popolo – Ravenna
Piazza Rotonda – Reggio di Calabria
In Rome:
Piazza del Popolo
Piazza di Spagna
Piazza Navona
Piazza del Campidoglio
Piazza Cavour
Piazza Venezia
Piazza Barberini
Piazza Colonna
Piazza del Quirinale
Piazza della Minerva
Piazza della Rotonda
Piazza dell'Esquilino
Piazza Di Santa Maria
Piazza Mattei
Piazza Farnese
Piazza di Monte Citorio
Piazza della Cisterna – San Gimignano
Piazza della Concordia – Salerno
Piazza d'Italia – Sassari
Piazza del Campo – Siena
Piazza del Duomo – Syracuse
Piazza Archimede – Syracuse
Piazza Unità d'Italia – Trieste
In Turin:
Piazza Castello
Piazza Vittorio Veneto (Torino)
Piazza del Consolata
Piazza San Carlo
Piazza Corpus Domini
Piazza Solferino (Torino)
:it:Piazza Statuto
In Venice:
Campo della Salute
Campo San Barnaba
Campo San Bartolomeo
Campo San Polo
Campo San Trovaso
Campo Sant'Angelo
Campo Santa Margherita
Campo Santa Maria Formosa
Campo Santi Giovanni e Paolo
Campo Santo Stefano
Piazza Baldassare Galuppi
Piazza San Marco
Piazzetta dei Leoncini
Piazzale Roma
Piazza delle Erbe – Verona
Piazza Bra – Verona
Piazza dei Signori – Vicenza

Kosovo
Skanderbeg Square – Pristina

Latvia
Cathedral Square – Riga

Lithuania
Cathedral Square – Vilnius

Luxembourg
Place d'Armes – Luxembourg City
Place de la Constitution – Luxembourg City
Place Guillaume II – Luxembourg City
Place des Martyrs – Luxembourg City

North Macedonia
Magnolia Square – Bitola
Macedonia Square – Skopje

Malta
For a full list of main squares in Malta visit List of Squares in Malta.
Victory Square, Birgu (Misraħ ir-Rebħa) – Birgu
St Helen's Square (Misraħ Santa Liena) – Birkirkara
Gavino Gulia Square (Misraħ Gavino Gulia) – Cospicua
Reggie Miller Square (Wesgħa Reggie Miller) – Fgura
Scicluna Square (Pjazza Memè Scicluna) – Gżira
St Paul Square, Hamrun (Pjazza San Pawl) – Ħamrun
Rotunda Square (Pjazza tar-Rotunda) – Mosta
Paola Square (Pjazza Antoine de Paule) – Paola
Maempel Square (Pjazza Federico Maempel) – Qormi
Balluta Square (Misraħ il-Balluta) – San Ġiljan
Lourdes Square (Misraħ Lourdes) – San Ġwann
Bay Square (Misraħ il-Bajja) – San Pawl il-Baħar (Buġibba)
Pope Benedict XV Square (Misraħ il-Papa Benedittu XV) – Senglea
St. Anne Square (Pjazza Sant' Anna) – Sliema
St John's Square (Misraħ San Ġwann) – Valletta
St. George's Square (Misraħ San Ġorġ or Misraħ il-Palazz) – Valletta
Independence Square (It-Tokk) – Victoria
Our Lady Square (Misraħ tal-Madonna Medjatriċi) – Żabbar
Republic Square (Misraħ ir-Repubblika) – Żejtun
Republic Square (Misraħ ir-Repubblika) – Żurrieq

Moldova
Great National Assembly Square – Chișinău
Vasile Alecsandri Square – Bălți
Independence Square – Cahul

Montenegro
Court Square – Cetinje
Square of Arms – Kotor
Republic Square – Podgorica
Roman Square – Podgorica

Netherlands

Dam Square – Amsterdam
 Kromboomslot – Amsterdam
 Beestenmarkt – Delft
 Grote Markt – Delft
 Grote Markt – Gouda
 Buitenhof – The Hague
 Het Plein – The Hague
 Keizer Karelplein – Maastricht
 Onze-Lieve-Vrouweplein – Maastricht
 Coolsingel – Rotterdam
 Oberblaak – Rotterdam
 Grotemarkt – Schiedam
 Scherminkelstraat – Vlissingen
 Kraanplein – Zierikzee

Norway
Torgallmenningen – Bergen
The City Hall Square – Oslo
Stortorget – Oslo
Jernbanetorget – Oslo
Youngstorget – Oslo
Torget – Stavanger
Torget – Trondheim

Poland
Market Square – Katowice
Main Market Square – Kraków
Old Town Square – Łódź
Red Square – Łódź
 Plac Grunwaldzki – Szczecin
In Warsaw:
 Old Town Market Place
 Plac Bankowy (Bank Square)
 Plac Defilad (Parade Square)
 Plac Grunwaldzki
 Plac Konstytucji (Constitution Square)
 Plac Powstańców Warszawy (Warsaw Uprising Square)
 Plac Piłsudskiego (Piłsudski Square)
 Plac Trzech Krzyży (Three Crosses Square)
 Plac Wilsona (Wilson Square)
 Plac Zamkowy (Castle Square)
 Plac Zbawiciela (Savior Square)
 Plac Grunwaldzki, Wrocław – Wrocław
 Market Square – Wrocław
Old Market Square – Poznań

Portugal
Praça do Giraldo – Évora
In Lisbon:
Praça do Império
Praça do Comércio
Rossio
Restauradores Square
Praça da Figueira
Chiado
Rotunda da Boavista – Oporto
Praça do Almada – Póvoa de Varzim
Passeio Alegre – Póvoa de Varzim
Praça da Liberdade – Porto

Romania
University Square, Bucharest
Union Square, Bucharest
Constitution Square, Bucharest
Victory Square, Bucharest
Roman Square, Bucharest
Revolution Square, Bucharest
United Nations Square, Bucharest
Charles de Gaulle Square, Bucharest
George Enescu Square, Bucharest
Obor Square, Bucharest
South Square, Bucharest
Arch of Triumph Square, Bucharest
Free Press Square, Bucharest
New Times Square, Bucharest
Rosetti Square, Bucharest
Piața Sfatului, Brașov
Union Square, Cluj-Napoca
Great Square, Sibiu
Small Square, Sibiu
Union Square, Alba Iulia
Freedom Square, Timișoara
Union Square, Timișoara

Russia
In Moscow:
Red Square
Sobornaya Square
Lubyanka Square
Manezhnaya Square
Pushkinskaya Square
Komsomolskaya Square
Theatral Square
In St Petersburg:
Palace Square
Decembrists Square
St Isaac's Square
Field of Mars
Uprising Square

Serbia
Republic Square – Belgrade
Nikola Pašić Square – Belgrade
Students' Square – Belgrade
Terazije – Belgrade

Slovakia
Hlavné námestie – Bratislava
Hviezdoslavovo námestie – Bratislava

Slovenia
Congress Square – Ljubljana
Prešeren Square – Ljubljana
Tartini Square – Piran

Spain
Plaça de Catalunya – Barcelona
Plaça Sant Jaume – Barcelona
Plaça d'Espanya – Barcelona
Plaça Reial – Barcelona
Plaza Mayor – Madrid
Puerta del Sol – Madrid
Plaza de España – Madrid
Plaza de Colón – Madrid
Plaza del Castillo – Pamplona
Plaza Mayor – Salamanca
Praza do Obradoiro – Santiago de Compostela
Plaza de España – Seville
Plaza de San Francisco – Seville
Plaza de Zocodover – Toledo
Plaza Mayor – Valladolid
Plaza del Pilar – Zaragoza

Sweden
Götaplatsen – Gothenburg
Järntorget – Gothenburg
Kungsportsplatsen – Gothenburg
Stortorget, Karlskrona
Gustav Adolfs torg, Stockholm
Medborgarplatsen – Stockholm
Norrmalmstorg – Stockholm
Sergels torg – Stockholm

Switzerland
Rathausplatz – Aarau
Barfüsserplatz – Basel
Münsterplatz – Basel
Bubenbergplatz – Bern
Bundesplatz – Bern
Helvetiaplatz – Bern
Kornplatz – Chur
Place Georges-Python – Fribourg
Place du Bourg-de-Four – Geneva
Place Neuve – Geneva
Plaine de Plainpalais – Geneva
Place de la Palud – Lausanne
Place St-François – Lausanne
Piazza Grande – Locarno
Piazza Riforma – Lugano
Place des Halles – Neuchâtel
Place Pury – Neuchâtel
Lindenhof – Rapperswil
Marktplatz – St. Gallen
In Zürich:
Bellevueplatz
Lindenhof
Münsterhof
Neumarkt
Paradeplatz
Sechseläutenplatz
Zürichhorn

Turkey
Kızılay Square – Ankara
Taksim Square – Istanbul
Sultanahmet Square – Istanbul
Konak Square – Izmir

Ukraine
 Freedom Square – Kharkiv
 Freedom Square – Kherson
 Maidan Nezalezhnosti – Kyiv
 European Square – Kyiv
 Ploshcha Rynok – Lviv
 Semi-Circular Square – Odessa

United Kingdom

England

In Birmingham:
Brunswick Square
Centenary Square
Central Square
Chamberlain Square
Millennium Square
Oozells Square
Old Square
Priory Square
Rotunda Square
St Paul's Square
St Philip's Square
Victoria Square
The Water's Edge
Centenary Square – Bradford
Millennium Square – Bristol
Portland Square – Bristol
Queen Square – Bristol
Queen Square – Bath
Piece Hall – Halifax
In Leeds
Armouries Square
City Square
Dortmund Square
Hanover Square
Merrion Street Gardens
Millennium Square
Oakwood Square
Park Square
Pennypocket Park
Queen Square
Victoria Gardens
Woodhouse Square
St Mark's Square – Lincoln
St John's Gardens – Liverpool
Trafalgar Square – London
Horse Guards Parade – London
Piccadilly Circus – London
Leicester Square – London
Covent Market
In Manchester:
Albert Square
Angel Square
Cathedral Gardens
Exchange Square
Hardman Square
Lincoln Square
Parsonage Gardens
Piccadilly Gardens
Shambles Square
St Anne's Square
St John's Gardens
St Peter's Square
Stephenson Square
Whitworth Gardens (also known as Sackville Gardens)
Station Square – Milton Keynes
Queen's Court – Milton Keynes
Eldon Square – Newcastle upon Tyne
Market Square – Northampton
Old Market Square – Nottingham
In Sheffield:
Castle Square
Fargate
Fitzalan Square
Hallam Square
Leopold Square
Millennium Square
Orchard Square
Paradise Square
Peace Gardens
Sheaf Square
Tudor Square
Sunderland
Keel Square
St Georges Square – Sutton Coldfield
Lemon Quay – Truro
In York:
Exhibition Square
King's Square
St Helen's Square
St Sampson's Square

Northern Ireland
The Diamond – Enniskillen

Scotland
George Square – Glasgow
St Enoch Square – Glasgow
Royal Exchange Square – Glasgow
Cathedral Square – Glasgow
City Square – Dundee

Wales
Central Square – Cardiff 
Callaghan Square – Cardiff
Roald Dahl Plass – Cardiff
Castle Square – Swansea
St Mary's Square – Swansea
Mount Stuart Square – Cardiff

Vatican City
St Peter's Square

North America

Barbados
 National Heroes Square – Bridgetown
 Independence Square – Bridgetown

Canada
 Garden Square – Brampton, Ontario
 Olympic Plaza – Calgary, Alberta
 Churchill Square – Edmonton, Alberta
 Grand Parade – Halifax, Nova Scotia
 Celebration Square – Mississauga, Ontario
 In Montreal, Quebec:
 Phillips Square
 Place D'Youville
 Place Émilie-Gamelin
 Place Jacques-Cartier
 Place Jean-Paul-Riopelle
 Victoria Square, Montreal
 Saint-Louis Square
 Confederation Square – Ottawa, Ontario
 Civic Plaza – Prince George, British Columbia
 Place D'Youville – Quebec City, Quebec
 In Toronto, Ontario:
 Albert Campbell Square
 Mel Lastman Square
 Nathan Phillips Square
 Pecaut Square
 Trinity Square
 Yonge-Dundas Square
 In Vancouver, British Columbia:
 Robson Square
 Victory Square
 In Victoria, British Columbia:
Confederation Garden Court
 Bastion Square
 Market Square
 In Winnipeg, Manitoba:
 The Forks Market Plaza
 Old Market Square
 Portage and Main

Cuba
Parque Marti – Cienfuegos
In Havana:
Plaza de Armas
Plaza de la Catedral
Plaza de San Francisco
Plaza Vieja
Revolution Square
Plazuela de Segarte – Trinidad
Plazuela del Jigüe – Trinidad
Plaza Mayor – Trinidad

Haiti
Place Boyer – Pétion-Ville, Port-au-Prince
Place Saint-Pierre – Pétion-Ville, Port-au-Prince

Mexico
 Plaza de la Constitución – Mexico City
 Macroplaza – Monterrey

Puerto Rico 

 Plaza Colón – Mayagüez
 In Ponce:
 Plaza Degetau
 Plaza Las Delicias
 Plaza Luis Muñoz Rivera
 In San Juan:
 Plaza de Armas
 Plaza Colón

Trinidad and Tobago
 Independence Square – Port of Spain

United States
 Empire State Plaza – Albany, New York
 Arcata Plaza – Arcata, California
 Kenmore Square – Boston, Massachusetts
 Colony Square – Atlanta, Georgia
Copley Square – Boston, Massachusetts
 Post Office Square – Boston, Massachusetts
 Freedom Square – Boston, Massachusetts
 Lafayette Square – Buffalo, New York
 Niagara Square – Buffalo, New York
 Harvard Square – Cambridge, Massachusetts
 Inman Square – Cambridge, Massachusetts
 Kendall Square – Cambridge, Massachusetts
 Daley Plaza – Chicago, Illinois
 Public Square – Cleveland, Ohio
 Capitol Square – Columbus, Ohio
 Fountain Square – Cincinnati, Ohio
 Dealey Plaza – Dallas, Texas
 Campus Martius Park – Detroit, Michigan
 Old Town Square – Fort Collins, Colorado
 Market Square – Harrisburg, Pennsylvania
 Monument Circle – Indianapolis, Indiana
 Bergen Square and Journal Square – Jersey City, New Jersey
 Market Square – Knoxville, Tennessee
 Pershing Square – Los Angeles, California
 Peavey Plaza – Minneapolis, Minnesota
 Public Square, Nelsonville – Nelsonville, Ohio
 New Haven Green – New Haven, Connecticut
 Jackson Square – New Orleans, Louisiana
In New York City, New York:
 Chatham Square
 Cooper Square
 Hanover Square
 Herald Square
 Lincoln Square
 Madison Square
 Times Square
 Union Square
 Washington Square
 Worth Square
In Pittsburgh, Pennsylvania:
 Market Square
 Schenley Plaza
In Philadelphia, Pennsylvania:
 Franklin Square
 Rittenhouse Square
 Logan Square (Philadelphia)
 Washington Square
 Pioneer Courthouse Square – Portland, Oregon
 Kennedy Plaza – Providence, Rhode Island
 Alamo Plaza – San Antonio, Texas
 Main Plaza – San Antonio, Texas
 Alamo Square – San Francisco, California
 Civic Center Plaza – San Francisco, California
 Ghirardelli Square – San Francisco, California
 Portsmouth Square – San Francisco, California
 Union Square – San Francisco, California
 Bergen Place – Seattle, Washington
 Pioneer Square - Seattle, Washington
 Red Square – Seattle, Washington
 Davis Square – Somerville, Massachusetts
 Porter Square – Somerville, Massachusetts
 Sullivan Square – Somerville, Massachusetts
 Union Square – Somerville, Massachusetts
 Court Square – Springfield, Massachusetts
 Stearns Square – Springfield, Massachusetts
 Sugar Land Town Square – Sugar Land, Texas
 Clinton Square – Syracuse, New York
 Taunton Green – Taunton, Massachusetts
 Farragut Square – Washington, D.C.
 L'Enfant Plaza – Washington, D.C.
 McPherson Square – Washington, D.C.
 Mount Vernon Square – Washington, D.C.
 Public Square – Watertown, New York
 Woodstock Square – Woodstock, Illinois
 Getty Square – Yonkers, New York
 Santa Fe Plaza – Santa Fe, New Mexico

South America

Argentina
In Buenos Aires
Plaza de Mayo
Plaza de la Republica
Plaza Miserere
Plaza San Martin
Plaza Constitucion
Parque Lezama
In Rosario
Plaza 25 de Mayo
National Flag Park
Parque Alem
Plaza Montenegro
Plaza San Martin

Brazil
Praça dos Três Poderes (Three Powers Square) – Brasília
Praça dos Girassóis (Square of the Sunflowers) – Palmas
Praça da República – Rio de Janeiro
Praça Quinze de Novembro – Rio de Janeiro
Largo da Carioca – Rio de Janeiro
Praça da República – São Paulo
Praça da Sé – São Paulo
Pátio do Colégio – São Paulo

Chile
Plaza de la Independencia – Concepción
Plaza de Armas – Santiago
Plaza Italia – Santiago
Plaza Victoria – Valparaíso

Colombia
Plaza de Bolívar – Bogotá

Ecuador
Plaza de La Independencia – Quito

Paraguay
Plaza de Armas – Asunción

Peru
Plaza de Armas – Lima

Uruguay
Plaza Independencia and Plaza Matriz – Montevideo

See also
List of city squares by size
Plaza de Armas

References 

Squares
List